Truncatella is a genus of very small land snails with an operculum, terrestrial gastropod mollusks in the family Truncatellidae. These small and minute snails live on land, very close to seawater. They walk with a strange looping action, and the adults have truncated shells. Many of the species are small enough to be considered micromollusks.

Truncatella is the type genus of the family Truncatellidae.

Description

As implied by the name, these snails are notable for the way they modify their elongated shells as they mature, breaking off several of the apical whorls, and forming a relatively smooth seal for the remainder of the shell.

Locomotion
The method of locomotion used by Truncatella is unusual. Instead of gliding over a slime trail using minute waves in its foot, Truncatella uses a very large and muscular proboscis to reach ahead and grasp a surface, at which point the small foot releases its hold and the proboscis contracts to pull the animal forward, after which the entire procedure is usually repeated.

Distribution and habitat
This genus occurs in tropical and subtropical areas. The various species of Truncatella are pantropical in distribution, with a few exceptions such as Truncatella truncatula and Truncatella subcylindrica.

Most of the species in this genus live in a habitat that is neither fully terrestrial nor fully marine: they live under plant debris near high tide level, where they are occasionally wetted with seawater by waves. A small minority of the species are fully terrestrial.

These small snails are typically found associated with drifts of plant material,  where their eggs are deposited.

The adaptations of these land snails to the terrestrial environment are not so perfect as they are in the more usual pulmonate land snails, and their terrestrial adaptations may in fact be comparatively recent.

Species

The genus Truncatella was erected by Antoine Risso (Risso, 1826) for T. costulata (now T. subcylindrica), which is the type species for this genus.

There are several genera within the Truncatellidae, but the eponymous genus Truncatella is the largest (in terms of number of species); other genera in the family are Geomelania, Taheitia, and Blandiella.

There are approximately 30 species in the genus Truncatella, including:
 † Truncatella arcicostata H.-J. Wang, 1982 
 Truncatella avenacea Garrett, 1887
 Truncatella bahamensis Clench and Turner, 1948
 Truncatella bairdiana C. B. Adams, 1852
 Truncatella barbadensis L. Pfeiffer, 1857
 Truncatella brazieri Cox, 1868
 Truncatella californica Pfeiffer, 1857 - California truncatella
 Truncatella caribaeensis Reeve, 1842 - Caribbean truncatella
 Truncatella clathrus Lowe, 1832
 † Truncatella crassolabia H.-Z. Pan, 1982 
 Truncatella diaphana Gassies, 1869
 † Truncatella directa Y.-T. Li, 1988 
 Truncatella granum Garrett, 1872
 Truncatella guerinii Villa & Villa, 1841
 † Truncatella hermitei Bardin, 1879
 † Truncatella hubeiensis Y.-T. Li, 1987 
 † Truncatella jiaozhouensis T. Yu, Salvador, H. Wang, Y. Fang, Neubauer, S. Li, H. Zang & X. Wan, 2021 
 Truncatella marginata Küster, 1855
 Truncatella oagariensis (Kuroda, 1960)
  † Truncatella obliqua H.-Z. Pan, 1982
 Truncatella obscura Morelet, 1882
 † Truncatella parva Y.-T. Li, 1988 
 Truncatella pfeifferi Martens, 1860
 Truncatella quadrasi Möllendorff, 1893
 † Truncatella rabora H.-Z. Pan, 1982 
 Truncatella reclusa (Guppy, 1871)
 Truncatella rostrata Gould, 1848
 Truncatella rustica Mousson, 1865
 † Truncatella sanshuiensis W. Yü & X.-Q. Zhang, 1982 
 Truncatella scalarina Cox, 1867
 Truncatella scalaris (Michaud, 1830) - ladder truncatella
 Truncatella semperi Kobelt, 1884
 † Truncatella sinensis Y.-T. Li, 1988 
 Truncatella stimpsonii Stearns, 1872: synonym of Truncatella californica L. Pfeiffer, 1857
 Truncatella subcylindrica (Linnaeus, 1767)
 Truncatella teres (Pfeiffer, 1857): synonym of Truncatella marginata Küster, 1855
 Truncatella thaanumi Clench & Turner, 1948
 Truncatella truncatula J.P.R. Draparnaud, 1801: synonym of  Truncatella subcylindrica (C. Linnaeus, 1767) 
 Truncatella vincentiana Cotton, 1942
 † Truncatella wattebledi Benoist, 1878 
 † Truncatella xuanchengensis H.-Z. Pan, 1982 
 Truncatella yorkensis (Cox, 1868): synonym of Truncatella guerinii A. Villa & J. B. Villa, 1841

Synonyms
 † Truncatella antediluviana Deshayes, 1861: synonym of † Bouryia antediluviana (Deshayes, 1861)  (superseded combination)
 Truncatella arcasiana Crosse, 1868: synonym of Taheitia arcasiana (Crosse, 1868)(original combination)
 Truncatella atomus Philippi, 1841: synonym of Omalogyra atomus (Philippi, 1841) (original combination)
 Truncatella aurantia A. Gould, 1847: synonym of Truncatella guerinii A. Villa & J. B. Villa, 1841
 † Truncatella bezanconi Cossmann, 1892: synonym of † Murchisonella bezanconi (Cossmann, 1892) (superseded combination)
 Truncatella bilabiata L. Pfeiffer, 1840: synonym of Truncatella pulchella L. Pfeiffer, 1839 (junior subjective synonym)
 Truncatella capillacea L. Pfeiffer, 1859: synonym of Truncatella pulchella L. Pfeiffer, 1839
 Truncatella caribaeensis Reeve, 1842, sensu Clench & Turner, 1948: synonym of Truncatella pulchella L. Pfeiffer, 1839 (misidentification)
 Truncatella ceylanica Pfeiffer, 1857: synonym of Truncatella marginata Küster, 1855 (junior synonym)
 Truncatella concinna Pease, 1871: synonym of Truncatella guerinii A. Villa & J. B. Villa, 1841
 † Truncatella costata Cossmann, 1895: synonym of Truncatella wattebledi Benoist, 1878  (invalid; not L. Pfeiffer 1839)
 Truncatella costata L. Pfeiffer, 1839: synonym of Truncatella scalaris (Michaud, 1830)
 Truncatella costellifera Pease, 1871: synonym of Truncatella rustica Mousson, 1865
 Truncatella costulata Risso, 1826: synonym of Truncatella subcylindrica (Linnaeus, 1767)
 Truncatella cristata Crosse, 1868: synonym of Truncatella guerinii A. Villa & J. B. Villa, 1841
 Truncatella cumingii C. B. Adams, 1845: synonym of Truncatella scalaris (Michaud, 1830)
 † Truncatella cylindrata Briart & Cornet, 1887: synonym of † Bouryia cylindrata (Briart & Cornet, 1887) (superseded combination)
 Truncatella debilis Mousson, 1873: synonym of Truncatella subcylindrica (Linnaeus, 1767) 
 Truncatella desnoyersii (Payraudeau, 1826): synonym of Truncatella subcylindrica (Linnaeus, 1767)
 † Truncatella distensa Cossmann, 1888: synonym of † Bouryia distensa (Cossmann, 1888) (superseded combination)
 Truncatella elongata L. Pfeiffer, 1856: synonym of Geomelania elongata (L. Pfeiffer, 1856)
 Truncatella fasciata Tapparone Canefri, 1886: synonym of Truncatella guerinii A. Villa & J. B. Villa, 1841
 Truncatella ferruginea (Cox, 1868): synonym of Truncatella guerinii A. Villa & J. B. Villa, 1841
 Truncatella filicosta Poey, 1858: synonym of Geomelania elongata (L. Pfeiffer, 1856)
 Truncatella floridana Hubricht, 1983: synonym of Truncatella pulchella L. Pfeiffer, 1839
 Truncatella funiculus Mousson, 1870: synonym of Taheitia funiculus (Mousson, 1870) (original combination)
 Truncatella fusca Philippi, 1841: synonym of Setia fusca (Philippi, 1841)
 Truncatella futunaensis Mousson, 1871: synonym of Truncatella rustica Mousson, 1865 (junior subjective synonym)
 Truncatella gracilenta W. G. Binney, 1858: synonym of Truncatella californica L. Pfeiffer, 1857 (nomen nudum)
 Truncatella gracilenta E. A. Smith, 1897: synonym of Taheitia gracilenta (E. A. Smith, 1897) (original combination)
 Truncatella haitensis Weinland, 1876: synonym of Geomelania haitensis (Weinland, 1876) (original combination)
 Truncatella japonica Pilsbry & Y. Hirase, 1905: synonym of Truncatella pfeifferi E. von Martens, 1861 (junior synonym)
 Truncatella juliae de Folin, 1872: synonym of Parthenina juliae (de Folin, 1872) (original combination)
 Truncatella kiusiuensis Pilsbry, 1902: synonym of Truncatella pfeifferi E. von Martens, 1861 (junior synonym)
 Truncatella labiosa Souverbie, 1862: synonym of Truncatella teres L. Pfeiffer, 1857: synonym of Truncatella marginata Küster, 1855 (junior subjective synonym)
 Truncatella laevigata Risso, 1826: synonym of Truncatella subcylindrica (Linnaeus, 1767)
 Truncatella laevissima Kuroda, 1956: synonym of Truncatella pfeifferi E. von Martens, 1861
 Truncatella lirata Poey, 1858: synonym of Geomelania lirata (Poey, 1858)
 Truncatella lowei Shuttleworth, 1852: synonym of Truncatella subcylindrica (Linnaeus, 1767) 
 Truncatella lubrica Held, 1847: synonym of Platyla polita (W. Hartmann, 1840) (junior synonym)
 Truncatella manchurica (A. Adams, 1861): synonym of Cecina manchurica A. Adams, 1861 (superseded combination)
 Truncatella mariannarum Quadras & Möllendorff, 1894: synonym of Taheitia mariannarum (Quadras & Möllendorff, 1894) (original combination)
 Truncatella micra Tenison Woods, 1878: synonym of Truncatella scalarina Cox, 1867 (junior synonym)
 Truncatella microlena Monterosato, 1878: synonym of Truncatella subcylindrica (Linnaeus, 1767)
 † Truncatella minor Briart & Cornet, 1887: synonym of † Bouryia minor (Briart & Cornet, 1887) (superseded combination)
 Truncatella minuscula de Folin, 1875: synonym of Graphis albida (Kanmacher, 1798) (synonym)
 Truncatella modesta C. B. Adams, 1851: synonym of Turbonilla rixtae De Jong & Coomans, 1988 (junior homonym)
 Truncatella montagui R. T. Lowe, 1832: synonym of Truncatella subcylindrica (Linnaeus, 1767) 
 Truncatella pacifica Pease, 1868: synonym of Truncatella guerinii A. Villa & J. B. Villa, 1841
 † Truncatella parisiensis Deshayes, 1861: synonym of † Bouryia parisiensis (Deshayes, 1861) 
 Truncatella pulchella Pfeiffer, 1839 - beautiful truncatella - synonyms: Truncatella bilabiata, Truncatella bilabiata bilabiata, Truncatella bilabiata barbadensis.
 Truncatella pellucida Dohrn, 1860: synonym of Truncatella marginata f. pellucida Dohrn, 1860: synonym of Truncatella marginata Küster, 1855
 Truncatella porrecta A. Gould, 1847: synonym of Taheitia porrecta (A. Gould, 1847) (original combination)
 Truncatella princeps Dohrn, 1866: synonym of Truncatella rostrata A. Gould, 1847 (junior synonym)
 Truncatella punctata Monterosato, 1878: synonym of Truncatella subcylindrica (Linnaeus, 1767)
 Truncatella regina Hubricht, 1983: synonym of Truncatella clathrus R. T. Lowe, 1832
 Truncatella scalariformis C. B. Adams, 1845: synonym of Truncatella scalaris (Michaud, 1830)
 Truncatella scalariformis Reeve, 1842: synonym of Taheitia scalariformis (Reeve, 1842) (original combination)
 Truncatella schneideri I. Rensch, 1937: synonym of Taheitia schneideri (Rensch, 1937)
 Truncatella semicostulata Jickeli, 1874: synonym of Truncatella marginata f. pellucida Dohrn, 1860: synonym of Truncatella marginata Küster, 1855
 Truncatella stimpsonii Stearns, 1872: synonym of Truncatella californica L. Pfeiffer, 1857
 Truncatella striata Reeve, 1842: synonym of Coxiella striata (Reeve, 1842) (original combination)
 Truncatella striatula Menke, 1843: synonym of Coxiella striatula (Menke, 1843) (original combination)
 Truncatella subauriculata Quadras & Möllendorff, 1894: synonym of Taheitia mariannarum (Quadras & Möllendorff, 1894) (junior synonym)
 Truncatella succinea C. B. Adams, 1845: synonym of Truncatella caribaeensis Reeve, 1842 (junior subjective synonym)
 Truncatella tatarica Schrenck, 1867: synonym of Cecina tatarica (Schrenck, 1867) (original rank)
 Truncatella teres L. Pfeiffer, 1857: synonym of Truncatella marginata Küster, 1855
 Truncatella truncatula (Draparnaud, 1801): synonym of Truncatella subcylindrica (Linnaeus, 1767) (junior synonym)
 Truncatella turricula Mousson, 1870: synonym of Taheitia turricula (Mousson, 1870) (original combination)
 Truncatella ultima I. Rensch, 1937: synonym of Taheitia ultima (I. Rensch, 1937) (original combination)
 Truncatella valida L. Pfeiffer, 1846: synonym of Truncatella guerinii A. Villa & J. B. Villa, 1841 (junior synonym)
 Truncatella ventricosa Reeve, 1842: synonym of Tomichia ventricosa (Reeve, 1842) (original combination)
 Truncatella vitiana A. Gould, 1847: synonym of Truncatella guerinii A. Villa & J. B. Villa, 1841
 Truncatella wallacei H. Adams, 1865: synonym of Taheitia wallacei (H. Adams, 1865) (original combination)
 † Truncatella weixianensis Youluo, 1978 (unavailable name)
 Truncatella wrighti L. Pfeiffer, 1862: synonym of Geomelania lirata (Poey, 1858)
 Truncatella yorkensis Cox, 1868: synonym of Truncatella guerinii A. Villa & J. B. Villa, 1841

References

External links 
 Risso A. (1826). Histoire naturelle des principales productions de l'Europe méridionale et particulièrement de celles des environs de Nice et des Alpes Maritimes, vol. 4. Paris: Levrault. vii + 439 pp., pls 1-12
 Issel, A. (1880). Crociera del Violante comandato dal capitano armatore Enrico d'Albertis dureante l'anno 1877. I. Parte narrativa (pp. 199-236). II. Risultati Scientifici. Cenni sulla geologia della Galita (pp. 237-258). Molluschi terrestri e d'acqua dolce, viventi e fossili (pp. 259-282). Annali del Museo civico di storia naturale di Genova. (1) 15: 199-282
 Risso, A. (1826-1827). Histoire naturelle des principales productions de l'Europe Méridionale et particulièrement de celles des environs de Nice et des Alpes Maritimes. Paris, F.G. Levrault. 3(XVI): 1-480, 14 pls.
 Leach, W. E. (1852). Molluscorum Britanniae Synopsis. A synopsis of the Mollusca of Great Britain arranged according to their natural affinities and anatomical structure. Van Voorst, London, viii + 376 pp. (edited posthumously by J. E. Gray)
 Guppy, R. J. L. (1871). Notes on some new forms of terrestrial and fluviatile Mollusca found in Trinidad. American Journal of Conchology. 6(4): 306–311.
 Clench, W. J. & Turner, R. D. (1948). A catalogue of the family Truncatellidae with notes and descriptions of new species. Occasional Papers on Mollusks. 1(13): 157-212, 4 plates.
 Gofas, S.; Le Renard, J.; Bouchet, P. (2001). Mollusca. in: Costello, M.J. et al. (eds), European Register of Marine Species: a check-list of the marine species in Europe and a bibliography of guides to their identification. Patrimoines Naturels. 50: 180-213
 Pilsbry, H. A. & Brown, A. P. (1914). The method of progression in Truncatella. Proceedings of the Academy of Natural Sciences of Philadelphia. 66: 426-428
 Dall, W. H. (1905). Fossils of the Bahama Islands, with a list of the non-marine mollusks. In: G. B. Shattuck (ed.). The Bahama Islands. The Geographical Society of Baltimore, The Johns Hopkins Press, The MacMillan Co., New York, i-xxxii, 630 pp., 93 pls. pp. 21-48, pls. 11-13
 van Hyning, T. (1942). Record find of Truncatella. The Nautilus. 56(1): 34
 Pilsbry, H. A. (1926). Truncatella versus Acmea. The Nautilus. 40(1): 32-33
 "Genus summary for Truncatella" AnimalBase.

Truncatellidae
Gastropod genera
Taxa named by Antoine Risso
Taxonomy articles created by Polbot